Kayadibi is a village in Tarsus district of Mersin Province, Turkey. Berdan Dam resorvir is to the west of the village. The population of village is 341  as of 2011. Main economic activity is farming. Grapes and various vegetables and produced.

References

Villages in Tarsus District